Cosimo Bambi (born 21 September 1980, in Florence, Italy) is an Italian relativist and cosmologist who is currently a professor of Physics at Fudan University in Shanghai, China.

Bambi's research interests include strong field tests of general relativity, black holes, gravitational collapse, and physics of the early Universe. He has more than 100 publications in all the above topics and is highly cited. He has also written three monographs/books on particle cosmology, black holes, and general relativity. The Quantum Bambi effect is named after him.

Bambi received  the Laurea degree from Florence University in 2003 and the Doctoral degree from Ferrara University in 2007 under the supervision of Sasha Dolgov. He had research positions at Wayne State University, IPMU at The University of Tokyo, and LMU Munich. He joined the Department of Physics at Fudan University as a faculty member under the Thousand Young Talents Program at the end of 2012 and was named Xie Xide Junior Chair Professor of Physics in 2016. In 2015, he was named Humboldt Fellow and got a visiting position at the University of Tübingen.

Main awards 
 Magnolia Silver Award from the Municipality of Shanghai (2018)
 Xu Guangqi Prize from the Embassy of Italy in China (2018)
 Named Humboldt Fellow (2015)
 Thousand Young Talents Award (2012)

Books and articles 
Cosimo Bambi has published more than 100 refereed papers as first or corresponding author on high impact factor journals. He has authored three books and edited one book.

Books 
C. Bambi, Introduction to General Relativity (Springer Singapore, 2018)
C. Bambi, Black Holes: A Laboratory for Testing Strong Gravity (Springer Singapore, 2017)
C. Bambi (Editor), Astrophysics of Black Holes (Springer-Verlag Berlin Heidelberg, 2016)
C. Bambi and A.D. Dolgov, Introduction to Particle Cosmology (Springer-Verlag Berlin Heidelberg, 2016)

Representative papers 
Z. Cao et al., Testing general relativity with the reflection spectrum of the supermassive black hole in 1H0707-495, Phys. Rev. Lett. 120, 051101 (2018)
C. Bambi et al., Testing the Kerr black hole hypothesis using X-ray reflection spectroscopy, Astrophys. J. 842, 76 (2017)
C. Bambi, Testing black hole candidates with electromagnetic radiation, Rev. Mod. Phys. 89, 025001 (2017)
C. Bambi and E. Barausse, Constraining the quadrupole moment of stellar-mass black-hole candidates with the continuum fitting method, Astrophys. J. 731, 121 (2011)
C. Bambi and K. Freese, Apparent shape of super-spinning black holes, Phys. Rev. D 79, 043002 (2009)

References 

1980 births
Living people
Cosmologists
Academic staff of Fudan University
21st-century Italian physicists
University of Ferrara alumni
University of Florence alumni
Italian expatriates in China